The 1940 Lafayette Leopards football team was an American football team that represented Lafayette College in the Middle Three Conference during the 1940 college football season. In its fourth  season under head coach Edward Mylin, the team compiled a 9–0 record. George Moyer was the team captain. The team played its home games at Fisher Field in Easton, Pennsylvania.

Schedule

References

Lafayette
Lafayette Leopards football seasons
Lafayette Leopards football